Nel Erasmus (born 1928 in Bethal, Transvaal Province, South Africa) is a South African artist.

Erasmus studied at the Académie Ranson, École des Beaux Arts, and Sorbonne in Paris in 1953 and exhibited her works for the first time in Paris in 1955. Her first solo exhibition was in South Africa in 1957, and she is one of the earliest South African abstract artists. Erasmus has produced thirty solo exhibitions and taken part in more than seventy group exhibitions, and her writing has been widely published. Her work received critical acclaim as she was the only South African artist to be included in Michel Seuphor’s 1964 survey of abstraction, Abstract Painting: 50 Years of Accomplishment.

Erasmus spent time in Paris in the early 1950s with other South Africans (Christo Coetzee, Paul du Toit, and Eric Loubser) who were inspired by the intuitive processes of post-war abstract painting in Paris.

Abstract Art in Africa 
Nel Erasmus was an early proponent of abstract art in South Africa, both as a practice and a principle. She was the director of the Johannesburg Art Gallery (1966–1977).

Erasmus' paintings feature bright colors and dynamic forms.

Education and influencers 
 1950 University of the Witwatersrand, BA in Fine Arts (under Joyce Leonard and Heather Martienssen, with Christo Coetzee, Gordon Vorster, Cecil Skotnes, and Larry Scully)
 1952 National Arts Teacher’s Certificate, Wits Technikon
 1952 Private study under Gina Berndtson
 Henry Focillon’s La vie des Formes: Erasmus has cited Henry Focillon's La vie des Formes as a significant influence on her work.
 Anton Hendriks, Director of the Johannesburg Art Gallery when Erasmus started working there, gave her an appreciation of museum discipline and intellectual honesty through his historical and philosophical interests.
 1953–1955 Sorbonne, Ecole des Beaux Arts, and Académie Ranson, Paris (under Gustave Singier, Selim Turan, and Marcel Fiorini)

Career junctions

Painting periods 
 1960s – formalist/post-cubist abstract period
 Early 1970s – emotionally-revealing and expressive
 Late 1970s – quiet colour fields fleeting energies give way to slow pushes and pulls
 1980s – calligraphy and objects in flux
 1990s – body as vessel, seed, and germination
 2000s – portraiture, polarity of heart and mind
 2010s – flight
 Currently – patterns of sound

Director of the Johannesburg Art Gallery (JAG) 1966–1977 
Nel Erasmus worked at the Johannesburg Art Gallery (JAG) from 1957 as a professional officer until her retirement as director in 1977. She contributed to the acquisition of artworks for public and corporate (especially Sanlam and Sasol) collections in South Africa, in particular the international modern and contemporary collection at the Johannesburg Art Gallery (JAG).

Erasmus’ notorious acquisition in 1973, the year Picasso died, of Pablo Picasso’s Tête d’Arlequin (1971), was made possible by funding from the Friends of the Museum organization. The acquisition of this painting of a clown met with resistance from conservative, censored, isolated, apartheid-era South Africa and provoked Erasmus to write a paper about why the acquisition was made.

Erasmus explained that it was the policy of other art museums in South Africa to make collections of South African art, but JAG had a policy to focus on international art.

Current work 
Nel Erasmus is in her 80s and still paints daily. The most recent exhibitions she has participated in were solo exhibitions in 2009 at the Dawid Ras Art Gallery (Johannesburg) and in 2015 at the Dawid Ras Gallery (Cape Town), and since then various group exhibitions.

Awards and honors 
 1991 Helgaard Steyn Award for Best South African Painting for Jazz Baby/Spent Autumn (1991)

Selected exhibitions 
 1955 Galerie Bogroff, Paris
 1955 10th Salon des Réalités Nouvelles in the Musée d'Art Modern, Paris
 1957 Henri Lidchi Art Gallery, Johannesburg (first solo exhibition)
 1957 Galerie Creuze and Musée d'Art Modern, Paris
 1965 Second Biennale de Paris, Paris, and year appointed at Johannesburg Art Gallery as Professional Officer)
 1965 São Paulo Biennale, São Paulo
 1982–1991 Cassirer Fine Art Gallery, Johannesburg

Selected collections and works 
 Anglo-American
 Iziko South African National Gallery, Cape Town – Sketch for the Great Cellist (1963), The Great Cellist (1963)
 Johannesburg Art Gallery, Johannesburg – Whirlpool in a Human Matrix (1974)
 Oliewenhuis Art Museum, Bloemfontein - Jazz Baby/Spent Autumn (1991)
 Pretoria Art Museum, Pretoria – Space Dance No. 5 (1984); Bold Swimmer (1986)
 Rand Merchant Bank
 Rembrandt Art Foundation – Lamps (1964)
 Sasol Collection
 Sanlam Art Collection – 6th Day of Creation (1995)
 Telkom
 University of Stellenbosch, Stellenbosch – Hands Off (1989)
 University of the Witwatersrand Art Museum, Johannesburg

Further reading 
 Abstract Painting: 50 Years of Accomplishment, from Kandinsky to the Present by Michel Seuphor. New York: Dell Publishing, 1964. ASIN: B000MXA55U. Amazon.com
 Art and Revolution by Diana Wylie. University of Virginia Press, 2008. . Amazon.com
 Emerging Johannesburg by Richard Tomlinson, Robert Beauregard, Lindsay Bremmer, Xolela Mangcu. Routledge, 2014. . Amazon.com
 Nel Erasmus: Portraits 1949–2009 by Nel Erasmus, Antoinette Glatthaar-Theron. Stellenbosch Modern and Contemporary (SMAC) Art exhibition catalogue, 2009.
 Nel Erasmus – Review by Marelize van Zyl (editor), Deon Viljoen, Antoinette Glatthaar-Theron, Linda Stupart, Elza Miles. Stellenbosch Modern and Contemporary (SMAC) Art Gallery exhibition catalogue, 2011.
 Paris and South African artists, 1850–1965 by Lucy Alexander. Unknown, 1988. Amazon.com

References 

 SMAC Gallery

1928 births
Living people
South African artists
University of the Witwatersrand alumni